NGC 6884 is a planetary nebula located  in the constellation Cygnus, less than a degree to the southwest of the star Ο1 Cygni. The nebula was discovered on May 8, 1883 by American astronomer Edward C. Pickering.

This nebula consists of the cast-off outer atmosphere of an aging star. It is young and compact with a kinematic age of 720 years. The core is surrounded by a filamentary ring structure that is inclined at an angle of around 40–45° to the line of sight from the Earth. The core has an overall shape of a prolate ellipsoid with axis ratios of 1.6:1 and is inclined by 40°. The expansion velocity of the nebula ranges over 19–25 km/s.

References

External links
 

Planetary nebulae
6884
Cygnus (constellation)